Romuald Singer (November 8, 1920 – August 20, 1991) was director of the international section of the Centre for International Intellectual Property Studies (CEIPI), Strasbourg, and chairman of the Enlarged and the Legal Board of Appeal of the European Patent Office (EPO). He also authored the first edition of a well-known commentary on the European Patent Convention.

References

Further reading 
 J.B. van Benthem, "The European Patent System and European Integration", Translation of a revised version of the Romuald Singer Memorial Lecture held at the Patent Forum 1992 in Munich. Consulted on April 22, 2011.
 "Romuald Singer Memorial Lecture: European patent system and European integration", IIC 1993, pp. 435–445

1920 births
1991 deaths
Intellectual property law scholars
Patent law scholars